General Belgrano Partido is a partido east of Buenos Aires Province in Argentina.

The partido is named after Manuel Belgrano, an Argentine economist, lawyer, politician and military leader.

Economy

The economy of Gral. Belgrano partido is dominated by agriculture.

Settlements
Bonnement
Chas
General Belgrano
Gorchs
Ibáñez
Newton

External links
 General Belgrano Website

1891 establishments in Argentina
Partidos of Buenos Aires Province